Richard Toomey is an American former professional ice hockey player and coach who led Brown for four seasons in the mid-1970s.

Career statistics

Head coaching record

College

References

External links

American ice hockey coaches
American men's ice hockey forwards
Boston University Terriers men's ice hockey players
Brown Bears men's ice hockey coaches
Ice hockey coaches from Massachusetts
Living people
People from Newton, Massachusetts
Year of birth missing (living people)
Ice hockey players from Massachusetts